The Men's 100 Individual Medley (or "I.M.") at the 10th FINA World Swimming Championships (25m) was swum 18–19 December 2010 in Dubai, United Arab Emirates. On 18 December, 83 individuals swam in the Preliminary heats in the morning, with the top-16 finishers advancing to the Semifinals that evening. The top-8 finishers from Semifinals then advanced to the Final the next evening.

At the start of the event, the existing World (WR) and Championship records (CR) were:

The following records were established during the competition:

Results

Heats

Semifinals
Semifinal 1

Semifinal 2

Final

References

Individual medley 100 metre, Men's
World Swimming Championships (25 m)